Stokes-Lee House is located in Collingswood, Camden County, New Jersey, United States, on the 600 block of Lees Avenue.  The house was built in 1707 and was added to the National Register of Historic Places on September 10, 1987.

See also
National Register of Historic Places listings in Camden County, New Jersey

References

Collingswood, New Jersey
Houses on the National Register of Historic Places in New Jersey
Houses completed in 1707
Houses in Camden County, New Jersey
National Register of Historic Places in Camden County, New Jersey
Georgian architecture in New Jersey
New Jersey Register of Historic Places
1707 establishments in New Jersey